Keith Cole may refer to:

 Keith Cole, wrestler associated with the Cole Twins
 Keith Cole (artist), Canadian performance artist